The Melbourne Beach Pier is a historic pier in Melbourne Beach, Florida, United States. It is located at Ocean Avenue and Riverside Drive and the pier extends onto the Indian River. The Melbourne and Atlantic Railroad Company built the pier in 1889. On April 12, 1984, it was added to the U.S. National Register of Historic Places.

References

External links

Brevard County listings at National Register of Historic Places
Florida's Office of Cultural and Historical Programs
Brevard County listings
Melbourne Beach Pier

Buildings and structures in Brevard County, Florida
Indian River Lagoon
Melbourne Beach, Florida
National Register of Historic Places in Brevard County, Florida
Piers in Florida
Tourist attractions in Brevard County, Florida
Piers on the National Register of Historic Places
Transportation buildings and structures on the National Register of Historic Places in Florida